Khosrow and Shirin is the title of a famous tragic romance by the Persian poet Nizami Ganjavi (1141–1209), who also wrote Layla and Majnun. It tells a highly elaborated fictional version of the story of the love of the Sasanian king Khosrow II for the Armenian princess Shirin, who becomes queen of Persia. The essential narrative is a love story of Persian origin which was already well known from the great epico-historical poem the Shahnameh and other Persian writers and popular tales, and other works have the same title.

Variants of the story were also told under the titles "Shirin and Farhad".

Plot
Nizami's version begins with an account of Khosrow's birth and his education. This is followed by an account of Khosrow's feast in a farmer's house; for which Khosrow is severely chastised by his father. Khosrow asks forgiveness and repents his offence. Hormizd IV, who is now pleased with his son, forgives him. That very night, Khosrow sees his grandfather Anushirvan in a dream and Anushirvan gives him glad tidings of a wife named Shirin, a steed named Shabdiz, a musician named Barbad, and a great kingdom, that is Iran.

Shapur, Khosrow's close friend and a painter, tells Khosrow of the Armenian queen Mahin Banu and her niece Shirin. Hearing Shapur's descriptions of Shirin's flawless features, the young prince falls in love with Shirin, the Armenian princess. Shapur travels to Armenia to look for Shirin. Shapur finds Shirin and shows the image of Khosrow to Shirin. Shirin falls in love with Khosrow and escapes from Armenia to Khosrow's capital Mada'in; but meanwhile, Khosrow also flees from his father's anger and sets out for Armenia in search of Shirin.

On the way, he finds Shirin unclothed bathing and washing her flowing hair; Shirin also sees him; but since Khosrow was traveling in peasant clothes, they do not recognize one another. Khosrow arrives in Armenia and is welcomed by Shamira the queen of Armenia - yet he finds out that Shirin is in Mada'in. Again, Shapur is sent to bring Shirin. When Shirin reaches Armenia, Khosrow – because of his father's death - has to return to Mada'in. The two lovers keep going to opposite places until Khosrow is overthrown by a general named Bahrām Chobin and flees to Armenia.

In Armenia, Khosrow finally meets Shirin and is welcomed by her. Shirin, however, does not agree to marry Khosrow; unless Khosrow first claims his country back from Bahrām Chobin. Thus, Khosrow leaves Shirin in Armenia and goes to Constantinople. The Caesar agrees to assist him against Bahrām Chobin on condition that he marry his daughter Mariam. Khosrow is also forced to promise not to marry any one else as long as Mariam is alive. Khosrow succeeds in defeating his enemy and reclaims his throne. Mariam, out of jealousy, keeps Khosrow away from Shirin.

Meanwhile, a sculptor named Farhad falls in love with Shirin and becomes Khosrow's love-rival. Khosrow cannot abide Farhad, so he sends him as an exile to Behistun mountain with the impossible task of carving stairs out of the cliff rocks. Farhad begins his task hoping that Khosrow will allow him to marry Shirin. Yet, Khosrow sends a messenger to Farhad and gives him false news of Shirin's death. Hearing this false news, Farhad throws himself from the mountaintop and dies. Khosrow writes a letter to Shirin, expressing his regret for Farhad's death. Soon after this incident, Mariam also dies. According to Ferdowsi's version, it was Shirin who secretly poisoned Mariam. Shirin replies to Khosrow's letter with another satirical letter of condolences.

Khosrow, before proposing marriage to Shirin, tries to have intimacy with another woman named Shekar in Isfahan, which further delays the lovers' union. Finally, Khosrow goes to Shirin's castle to see her. Shirin, seeing that Khosrow is drunk, does not let him in the castle. She particularly reproaches Khosrow for his intimacy with Shekar. Khosrow, sad and rejected, returns to his palace.

Shirin eventually consents to marry Khosrow after several romantic and heroic episodes. Yet, Shiroyeh, Khosrow's son from his wife Mariam, is also in love with Shirin. Shiroyeh finally murders his father Khosrow and sends a messenger to Shirin conveying that after one week, she would have to marry him. Shirin, in order to avoid marrying Shiroyeh, kills herself. Khosrow and Shirin were buried together in the same grave.

Popularity in Persian literature

There are many references to the legend throughout the poetry of other Persian poets including Farrokhi, Qatran, Mas'ud-e Sa'd-e Salman, Othman Mokhtari, Naser Khusraw, Anwari and Sanai. Nizam al-Mulk mentioned that the legend was a popular story in his era.

Nizami's version

Although the story was known before Nizami, it was brought to its greatest romantic height by him. Unlike the Shahnameh, which focuses on the history, kingship and battles of Khosrow, Nizami decided to focus on the romantic aspect of the story.

When the Seljuq Sultan Arsalan Shah requested a love epic from the poet without specifying the subject further, Nizami picked on the story of lovers Khosrow and Shirin, a theme set in his own region and based on at least partly historical facts, though an aura of legend already surrounded it.

Nizami Ganjavi (1141–1209) himself considered it the sweetest story in the world:

It is believed to be one of the best works of Nizami. His first wife Afaq died after it was completed. Many versions of Nizami's work have been retold. The story has a constant forward drive with exposition, challenge, mystery, crisis, climax, resolution, and finally, catastrophe.

Besides Ferdowsi, Nizami's poem was influenced by Asad Gorgani and his "Vis and Rāmin". which is of the same meter and has similar scenes. Nizami's concern with astrology also has a precedent in the elaborate astrological description of the night sky in Vis and Ramin. Nizami had a paramount influence on the romantic tradition, and Gorgani can be said to have initiated much of the distinctive rhetoric and poetic atmosphere of this tradition, with the absence of the Sufi influences, which are seen in Nizami's epic poetry.

Influence
According to the Encyclopædia Iranica: "The influence of the legend of Farhad is not limited to literature, but permeates the whole of Persian culture, including folklore and the fine arts. Farhad's helve supposedly grew into a tree with medicinal qualities, and there are popular laments for Farhad, especially among the Kurds (Mokri)."

In 2011, the Iranian government's censors refused permission for a publishing house to reprint the centuries-old classic poem that had been a much-loved component of Persian literature for 831 years. While the Iranian Ministry of Culture and Islamic Guidance offered no immediate official explanation for refusing to permit the firm to publish their eighth edition of the classic, the Islamic government's concerns reportedly centered on the "indecent" act of the heroine, Shirin, in embracing her husband.

Orhan Pamuk's novel My Name Is Red (1998) has a plot line between two characters, Shekure and Black, which echoes the Khosrow and Shirin story, which is also retold in the book. The novel uses the Turkish spelling of Khosrow's name, Hüsrev.

Other versions
The tale has been retold by countless Sufi poets and writers in areas which were previously part of the Persian Empire or had Persian influences, such as the northern parts of the neighbouring Indian subcontinent. In Europe, the story was told by Hungarian novelist Mór Jókai. However, the story is usually told under the name of "Shirin Farhad". The story has also become a standard tale in traditional Punjabi Qisse and Bengali Kissa. The story has been filmed numerous times including: 1926, 1929, 1931, 1934, 1945, 1948, 1956 starring Madhubala and Pradeep Kumar, 1970, 1975 and 1978.

The tale was used as the inspiration for a 2008 Iranian film, Shirin, made by Abbas Kiarostami. In this formally unusual film, the story is told via the reactions of an audience of Iranian women as they sit watching the film in a cinema. The viewer has to divine the story by only ever seeing these emoting faces and listening to the film's soundtrack.

The story was also referenced in the Jonathan Richman and the Modern Lovers song "Shirin & Fahrad".

The tale was also an inspiration for the 2012 Bollywood romantic comedy film Shirin Farhad Ki Toh Nikal Padi.

See also
Layla and Majnun
Vis and Rāmin
Persian literature
Persian mythology

References

External links

 Encyclopædia Iranica, "Farhad", Heshmat Moayyad
 Encyclopædia Iranica, "ḴOSROWO ŠIRIN AND ITS IMITATIONS", Paola Orsatti
 Encyclopaedia of Islam, THREE, "Ferhad u Şirin (in Turkic literatures)", Muhsin Macit
 Nizami: "Khosru & Shireen", Medieval Sourcebook
 The Story of Khosrow and Shirin at iranian.com
 The story of Farhad and Shirin

12th-century books
Persian mythology
Persian poems
Medieval legends
Literary duos
Sufi literature
Love poems
World Digital Library
Historical poems
Shahnameh stories
Epic poems in Persian
Memory of the World Register in Iran